Ona Melvin Dodd (October 14, 1886 – December 17, 1956) was a third baseman in Major League Baseball. He played for the Pittsburgh Pirates in 1912.

References

External links

1886 births
1956 deaths
Major League Baseball third basemen
Pittsburgh Pirates players
Baseball players from Texas
Waco Navigators players
Beaumont Oilers players
Fort Worth Panthers players
Houston Buffaloes players
People from Springtown, Texas